The Solapur–Guntakal section (also known as Solapur–Guntakal line) is part of the Mumbai–Chennai line.

History
Great Indian Peninsula Railway, opened the Pune–Raichur sector of the Mumbai–Chennai line in stages: the portion from Pune to Barshi Road was opened in 1859, from Barshi Road to Mohol in 1860 and from Mohol to Solapur also in 1860. Work on the line from Solapur southwards was begun in 1865 and the line was extended to Raichur in 1871. Thus the line met the line of Madras Railway thereby establishing direct Mumbai–Chennai link.

Madras Railway extended its trunk route to Beypur / Kadalundi (near Calicut) and initiated work on a north-western branch out of Arakkonam in 1861.

The Wadi–Secunderabad line was built in 1874 by the Nizam's Guaranteed State Railway.

The metre gauge Gadag–Hotgi section was opened in 1884 by the Southern Mahratta Railway. The line was converted to  broad gauge in 2008.

The Vikrabad–Bidar -wide  broad gauge line was opened in 1932.

Gadwal is on the Dhone–Kacheguda line.

Electrification
The electrification of the Bhigwan-Hotgi section is in progress with completion expected by May 2021. The Kalaburgi-Hotgi section got electrified in March 2021. The Kalaburgi-Wadi section was electrified in 2018 and electrification between Guntakal–Wadi section was completed in the year 2015. With this, the Mumbai Chennai section is fully electrified. In September 2022, the entire Mumbai-Chennai section was also doubled.

Speed limit

Sheds
Guntakal diesel loco shed was started as a metre-gauge shed but after gauge conversions in Guntakal and Hubli divisions, it was converted to broad-gauge shed in 1995. It houses WDM-2, WDM-3A, WDM-3D and WDG-3A locos. There is a routine overhaul depot for wagon maintenance at Raichur and a coaching maintenance depot at Guntakal. A new electric shed is under construction and almost complete at Guntakal. Gooty has now a Diesel cum Electric shed and now homes around 30 high-power freight 3-phase WAG-9 locos.

Passenger movement
 is the only station on this line which is amongst the top hundred booking stations of Indian Railway.

References

External links
Trains at Solapur
 Trains at Wadi
 Trains at Raichur
 Trains at Guntakal
Trains at Gulbarga

5 ft 6 in gauge railways in India
Rail transport in Maharashtra
Rail transport in Karnataka
Rail transport in Andhra Pradesh

Transport in Guntakal
Transport in Solapur